The Rio Grande Sun is a weekly newspaper located in Española, New Mexico.

In 2012, the newspaper was the focus of a documentary film titled The Sun Never Sets. The film was produced and directed by Ben Daitz and narrated by Bob Edwards. In 2022 the paper came under new ownership.

References

External links
 Rio Grande Sun official website

Newspapers published in New Mexico